A prime suspect or key suspect is a person who is considered by the law enforcement agency investigating a crime to be the most likely suspect. The idiom "prime suspect" is believed to have originated in 1931. "Key suspect" is seen as early as 1948.

Reasons 
There are various reasons a person may be considered a prime suspect. These include:
Being positively identified as the only person seen at or near the scene of the crime around the time the crime occurred
Being linked by some form of forensic evidence, such as DNA
Being named by witness(es)
Having the most likely motive to commit the crime
Racial profiling
Having knowledge that only one who committed the crime would have
Having a history of committing crimes with some resemblance to the crime being investigated
Having confessed to the act

References

Law enforcement